Raymond Sullivan may refer to:

 Ray Sullivan (1977–2021), member of the  Rhode Island House of Representatives
 Raymond F. Sullivan (1908–1994), American politician from Massachusetts 
 Raymond L. Sullivan (1907–1999), California Supreme Court justice
 Gilbert O'Sullivan (Raymond Edward O'Sullivan, born 1946), Irish singer-songwriter